Jim Allan is a New Zealand and Australian (on Seniors) curler.

At the international level, he is a three-time  curler

At the national level, he is a two-time New Zealand men's champion (1998, 2003).

Teams

References

External links

Living people
New Zealand male curlers
Pacific-Asian curling champions
New Zealand curling champions
Australian male curlers
People from Ranfurly, New Zealand
Year of birth missing (living people)